Machig Labdrön (sometimes referred to as Ahdrön Chödron), or "Singular Mother Torch from Lab", 1055-1149) was a female Tibetan Buddhist monk believed to be  a reincarnation of Yeshe Tsogyal, and the renowned 11th-century Tibetan tantric Buddhist master and yogini that originated several Tibetan lineages of the Vajrayana practice of Chöd.

Nyingma scholar Khenchen Palden Sherab Rinpoche states that the Chöd tradition developed by Machig Labdrön is "a radical synthesis of the Prajnaparamita tradition and tantra guru yoga that 'cuts' through the ego."

Historical texts portray Machig Labdrön as the originator of the Chöd lineage which she developed in Tibet. This was confirmed in her own lifetime by Indian Brahmins and others, and Machig Labdron's creation of the Chöd lineage is not doubted by its modern practitioners.

The influences of other practices on Chöd are debated. Some posit Machig Labdron may have come from a Bön family, a position which contradicts historical records. According to Namkhai Norbu, Chöd might be interpreted through combining native shamanism with the Dzogchen teachings. Other Buddhist teachers and scholars offer differing interpretations of the origins of Chöd, and not all of them agree that Chöd has Bön or shamanistic roots.

Iconography

Iconographically, Machig Labdrön is depicted holding a large drum (Skt. damaru), a specific ritual item in the practice of Chöd, in her right hand and a bell (Skt. ghaṇṭa) in her left. Her right leg is often lifted and the standing left leg is bent in motion, in a dancing posture. Machig Labdron is depicted as white in color with three eyes and a pleasing countenance. She wears the Six Bone Ornaments of the charnel grounds, and stands on a lotus. Above Machig Labdron is Buddha Shakyamuni and mahasiddhas and the Chöd lineage masters, while specific teachers and lineage holders are on either side. Below her is a tantric deity holding a Chod bone trumpet and swinging skins, while Gesar and a wrathful tantric dakini are on either side.

Biography

Names
Apart from the name Machig Labdrön used here, the following spellings and transliterations are also found, all referring to the same person:

 Machik Lapkyi Drönma (Wylie: ma gcig lab kyi sgron ma), 
 Machig Lapdrönme (Wylie: ma gcig lab sgron ma), 
 Machik Labdron (Wylie: ma gcig lab sgron), 
 Maji Lab Dran (Wylie: ma gcig lab sgron), and 
 Machig Laphyi (Wylie: ma-gcig la-phyi sgron-ma) referring to her place of birth, La-phyi, in the region of Ü-Tsang.
 Machik Labdronma, the often used name by Tibetans

One of Machig Labdrön's teachers, Sönam Lama, gave her the tantric name of Dorje Wangchuma, which means "Diamond Independent Goddess."

Predictions of her birth
In the Life of Yeshe Tsogyel, Padmasambhava predicted that Yeshe Tsogyal would be reborn as Machig Labdrön, and her consort, Atsara Sale, would become Topa Bhadra, Machig Labdron's consort. Her assistant and Padmasambhava's secondary consort, Tashi Khyidren, would be reborn as Machig Labdron's daughter, and so on. All of the important figures in Yeshe Tsogyel's life were to be reborn in the life of Machig Labdron, including Padmasambhava himself, who would become Phadampa Sangye.

Tibetan Buddhists believe Machig Labdron was the Mind Stream emanation (tulku) of Yeshe Tsogyal, as well as "an emanation of the 'Great Mother of Wisdom,' Yum Chenmo, (prajnaparamita) and of Arya Tara, who transmitted to her teachings and initiations." Buddhists believe this pattern of reincarnations and emanations continued into the life just before her birth as Machig Labdrön and that in the lifetime before, she was the Indian yogi, Mönlam Drub. After his death, the body of the twenty-year-old Mönlam Drub is said to have remained "alive" in the cave of Potari in South India. According to tradition, it was Mönlam Drub's mindstream which entered the womb of Bum Cham "Great Noble Woman", who lived in the area of Labchi Eli Gangwar in Tibet, which caused the birth of Machig Labdron.

According to one version of Machig Labdron's biography, Machig Labdron's mother experienced auspicious dreams of dakinis shortly after conception, dreams which contained the vase and the conch of the Ashtamangala:

Dreams continued for her mother until the birth and Machig Labdron's sister also had prophetic dreams. Directly before the birth, Machig Labdron instructed her mother on preparations for her swaddling, and Bum Chan also felt the sounds of the reciting syllables "ah" and "ha ri ni sa".

Birth and early childhood
Machig Labdron's birth in 1055, on the 15th day of the third Tibetan lunar month, was accompanied by auspicious music, rainbow lights, reciting syllables, and with an open third eye. She sat upright immediately, and asked if her mother was well. Her first food was butter.

She was born in a fortressed village called Tsomer in Tamsho, in the Labshi region. Her father was Choyki Dawa, and her mother was Lungmo Bumcam. She had three siblings, and the 16 year old sister Bumey was present at the birth. The mother decided to guard Machig Labdron from the father, but the father decided to guard her as a family secret. Her elder brother was Shakya Gyaltsen, and another brother was born later.

Machig Labdron began reciting mantra at three years of age, reading at five years, and at eight years of age could quickly recite the Prajnaparamita text "The Perfection of Wisdom in Eight Thousand Verses". Machig Labdron was called "Ahdron" (the Light of Ah) and "Drontse" by the community, and referred to herself as "Rinchen Dronme". The local king gave her the name of Lapdron.

At thirteen years of age, she began studying Buddhism with Geshe Aton alongside her sister, previously ordained as the nun Tontso Rinchen Bum. Her ability in the expositions of Prajanaparamita texts surpassed those of the Geshes and monks. After three years with Geshe Aton, he suggested Machig Labdron move to continue studies of Buddhism with Drapa Ngongshechen in Yoru Dratang, at the Dopthrang monastery, where she moved with her sister and lived as a renunciate after receiving lay practitioner vows and bodhisattva vows. She became Lama Drapa's official reader, and at sixteen years of age participated as a recitation chaplain while reciting the Prajnaparamita Sutras, or 'The Perfection of Wisdom', a Mahayana sutra, for lay people in their homes on behalf of her teacher.

Young adulthood
The namtar entitled Secret Biography of Machig Labdron relates the struggles that Machig Labdron underwent in order to avoid traditional marriage and eventually leave home to practice Buddhism as her life's calling.

Machig Labdron's early teacher, Drapa Ngongshechen, gave her the reading transmissions for the Many Sutras, the Perfection of Wisdom in One Hundred Thousand Verses, in Twenty-Five Thousand Verses and in Eight Thousand Verses. She assimilated the sutras and commentaries, and realization arose. He asked her to stay for four years, after which he advised her to continue studies with Kyoton Sonam Lama.

With her realizations, Machig Labdron began to cut attachments to places and started to travel and live spontaneously as a yogini, while eating what she found, sleeping wherever, and wearing clothes of a beggar.

When she was twenty years of age, Sonam Lama conferred a series of empowerments on Machig Labdron at a temple in Ei Gangwa, during which her famous ultimate empowerments into the nature of reality from the sambhogakaya occurred. Later, Sonam Lama also conferred tantra, the Five Deities of Varahi, Secret Yoga Mantra, and transmissions which empower explanation, composition, and debate. Sonam Lama gave Machig Labdron the name of Queen of Vajra Space (rdo rje dbyings phyug ma) to match her level of accomplishment.

During the famous empowerment, Arya Tara foretold of a meeting with Indian pandita Topa Bhadra, or Topa Draya, an emanation of the Buddha Kapala.

But before, Machig Labdron met and received teachings from well-known Indian yogi Padampa Sanggye, also known as Dampa Sangye, a reincarnation of Padmasambhava, as foretold. Using esoteric sutra and tantra precepts of the paramitra, he conferred direct mind instructions, the Path of Guru Yoga, blessing empowerments, profound vajrayana Dzogchen practices, and numerous specific and profound empowerments and transmissions. Her realizations increased. Padampa Sanggye revealed both Buddha Shakyamuni and Manjushri predicted Machig Labdron's reincarnation and realizations. The Buddha referred to her by the name "Dronma", and Manjushri wrote, "...She will wander through towns, villages, and valleys, Charnel grounds and hermitages, And her teachings will spread".

Machig Labdron spent three years in central Tibet. While preparing for travels as a recitation chaplain in Echung, she had three prophetic dreams about Topa Bhadra before they met. On her journey, she received a teaching on Interdependent Origination from Red Manjushri.

Machig Labdron and Topa Bhadra met during her recitations and became spiritual consorts, while the prophesies that the union would lead to great benefit for beings were actualized. She was 23 years of age. He was also a Buddhist practitioner that later supported Machig Labdron in her practices. She then lived with him, and received some criticism for disregarding ordinary societal norms that contradicted the radical nature of Chöd. Together, they had two sons and one daughter (or two sons and two daughters, or three sons and two daughters by some accounts).

As a tantra practitioner while developing the Chöd tradition, Machig Labdron practiced with Dampa Sangye as her guru and reincarnation of Padmasambhava, which led to further profound realizations. Machig Labdron also practiced with her spiritual consort Topa Bhadra with whom she raised a family, living on the "red and white essence," according to a prediction given to Machig Labdron by Arya Tara.

Machig Labdron's teachers are also listed as Lama Shamarpa, Lama Beton (possibly the same as Aton), Lama Yartingpa, and Phamtingpa, from which she received vajrayana teachings, Great Completion Dzogchen empowerments and transmissions, and Mahamudra empowerments and transmissions.

Motherhood
Early in her life, Machig Labdron spent time living primarily in monasteries before cutting attachments to certain places. She was a vajrayana practitioner and realized when she met Topa Bhadra. After their initial union, she and her consort had children which became students and Chod lineage holders.

The exact number of children might be debated. In some sources, her three sons were Nyingpo Drubpa, Drubchung, and Yangdrub. Her two daughters were Kongcham and Lacham. In Sara Harding's translations, an elder son was named Drubpa, and another was named Kongpo Kyab or Drupse, while the youngest child and daughter was Drub Chungma.

Machig Labdron's son Drupse became the monk Tonyon Samdrup (thod-smyon bsam-grub), one of her main successors and a propagator of the Chod lineage. He took monk's vows at the age of 15 from Dampa Sangye after moving to Red House where Machig Labdron's seat was located. Tonyon Samdrup was known as the "Snowman of Shampogang" and began the tradition of black hat-wearing Chod practitioners named "Gangpa".

One of her sons started out as a thief. Machig Labdron was eventually able to bring him to the Dharma and became his teacher: "You may think that Gods are the one's who give you benefits, and Demons cause damage; but it may be the other way round. Those who cause pain teach you to be patient, and those who give you presents may keep you from practising the Dharma. So it depends on their effect on you if they are Gods or Demons," she said.

At the age of 35, prophesies continued to actualize. Machig Labdron showed signs of weariness of cyclic existence, and traveled to see Sonam Lama, Lama Drupa, and Padampa Sanggye. During those visits, she received teachings and empowerments, and prophesies about a move to the Copper Mountain in central Tibet. She also restrengthened her commitments by taking, or re-taking, lay vows and bodisattva vows.

Machig Labdrön's life as a spiritual master
Machig Labdron then returned to living as a renunciate at the age of 37, shaved her head and moved to a cave at Zangri Kangmar in the Copper Mountain. Her students gathered there and a community formed around her seat at the Red House.

Machig Labdron's numerous followers came from Tibet and Nepal, and included lamas, geshes, monks, nuns, kings, queens, ministers, chiefs, and lay people including lepers and beggars. "The reputation of her merit and teachings became known even in India."

At the age of 42, Topa Bhadra brought her younger son, Drupse, and her daughter, Drup Chungma, to the Red House before leaving for India. Both were already practicing and accomplishing sadhanas. Machig Labdron cured Drupse from an illness before he became the monk named Tonyon Samdrup, and the main lineage holder of Chod.

During Machig Labdrön's lifetime, Buddhist teachings which came from India to Tibet were considered authentic, and it was believed there were no teachings that originated in Tibet for Indian Buddhist practitioners. As one of Machig Labdron's biographies states:

As a result, there was so much controversy over Machig Labdrön's teachings, by the time she was 52 years old, that a delegation of acharyas was sent from Bodh Gaya, India to Tibet to assess Machig Labdron's qualifications and teachings, similar to an Inquisition. Her normal crowd of 5,000 students and followers swelled to 500,573 people gathered at Zangri Khangmar, Machig Labdron's seat in Tibet from the age of 37 until her death at the age of 99. As she taught and debated with the acharyas questioning her and her lineage's authenticity, the words were translated into Tibetan, Hindi, and Nepali. In addition, a delegation was sent to South India to find the body of her previous incarnation as Mönlam Drub, and to witness the making of śarīra relics as Machig Labdron instructed. Her predictions actualized, thus adding further validity to her status as a master and lineage holder.

As a result of these and other events, it was determined that Machig Labdron's Chod teachings were indeed authentic, and established that her Chöd teachings were the first Buddhist teachings to emerge in Tibet. One source says, "Word of the widespread practice of Mahāmudra Chö in Tibet and Nepal was first viewed in India with great scepticism. A delegation of āchāryas was sent from Bodh Gayā to Tibet to test Machig Labrön and her teaching resulted in the acceptance of Mahāmudrā Chö as a valid and authentic Mahāyāna tradition. Thereafter, its practice spread even to India."

Students
Along with her daughter(s) and son(s), prominent among Machig Labdron's students were four main female students which were called Machig Labdrön's Gyen or "Ornaments", and called the "Four Daughters". Their names are Gyaltsen Ne, Sonam Gyaltsen, Palden Gyen, and Bumso Rinchen Gyen. They propagated a distinct Gyen lineage of Chöd, developed from the oral lineage of Chod and the tantric lineage of Vajrayana Chöd.

Many of Machig Labdrön's teachings were given in direct response to the questions of her students.

In addition to her son Tonyon Samdrup, another student named Gyelwa Drubche, or Gyelwa Dondrub, was her heart student and another main lineage holder. Sources state it's unlikely he was her biological son named Drubpa, and state Drubpa married into local royalty and did not practice Buddhism. Kugom Choyki Sengge was also a student and lineage holder that propagated the Chöd teachings.

Parinirvana

Emanations
Machig Labdrön stated she accomplished the state of a non-returner, and would emanate instead of reincarnate. She has emanated in Tibet, Bhutan and in the West.

 Jomo Menmo
In Tibet, it is said that Machig Labdrön emanated as Jomo Menmo (1248–1283). According to the information given by the website of the 17th Gyalwang Karmapa Ogyen Trinley Dorje, Jomo Menmo was born as a "karmic emanation" of Yeshe Tsogyal.

 Chokyi Dorje
The first Samding Dorje Phagmo, Chökyi Drönma (1422–1455), a female tulku lineage of Vajravārāhī, was understood to be an emanation of Machig Labdrön.

 Shukseb Jetsun Choying Zangmo
In more recent history, in Tibet, the great yogini Shukseb Jetsun Choying Zangmo (1852–1953)—also called Ani Lochen, Lochen Chönyi Zangmo, and Shukseb Jetsun Rinpoche—was a recognized emanation of Machig Labdron. Shuksheb Jetsun reinvigorated the Shuksep gompa of the Kagyü thirty miles from Lhasa on the slopes of Mount Gangri Thökar.

 Khandro Sonam Peldron
In the 12th century, Khandro Sonam Peldron of Wang Dharlung, Bhutan is said to be a main emanation of Machik Labdron. Khandro Sonam was the wife of Phajo Drugom Zhipo of Tibet, who were crucial in the establishment of the Drukpa Lineage of Kagyü in Bhutan. Phajo Drugom Zhigpo was sent to Bhutan by Tsangpa Gyarey Yeshey Dorji of Druk Ralung, Tibet, to establish the Drukpa Lineage in Bhutan. Phajo and Khandro  had four sons and a daughter together. The bridge where Phajo and Khandro met in Thimphu still exists today, known as Lungtenzampa.  Khandro Sonam Peldron is known to have achieved the supreme enlightenment called Zha lue Phochen and is known to have flown to the heavenly Dali I abode from near Tango monastery in Thimphu.

 Lama Tsultrim Allione
Lama Tsultrim Allione (1947- ), an American Buddhist teacher, was recognized in 2007 as an emanation of Machig Labdrön at Zangri Khangmar, Tibet, the place where Machig Labdrön lived from ages 37 to 99, a from where she passed into the state of non-returner. She was recognized by the resident Rinpoche, Karma Nyitön Kunkhyab Chökyi Dorje, himself a reincarnation of the brother of the 8th Karmapa. Karma Nyitön Kunkhyab Chökyi Dorje asked Lama Tsultrim to sit on the throne, and offered Lama Tsultrim a self-arisen golden crystal kīla or ceremonial dagger, the only remaining tsa tsa (icon) made from the ashes of Machig's body (a mixture of clay and ash imprinted with an image of Machig dancing), texts of Machig's teachings, a hat with symbolic meaning designed by Machig, and various other treasures. Afterwards, Lama Tsultrim Allione was also recognized in Nepal as an emanation of Machig Labdrön by Lama Tshering Wangdu Rinpoche, holder of the lineage of Dampa Sangye.

Machig Labdrön's Chöd
Machig Labdrön's Chöd, also known as Mahamudra Chöd, has been widespread in Tibet since Machig's lifetime. It is also called "The Beggars' Offering" or "The Cutting-Off-Ritual." Chöd is a visionary Buddhist practice of cutting attachment to one's corporeal form (in terms of the dualistic proclivity to relate to one's corporeal form as a reference-point that proves one's existence). This means that a practitioner offers the mandala of their own body in a ganachakra rite. The practitioner works entirely with their own mind, visualizing the offering, and—by practicing in lonely and dreaded places, like cemeteries—works to overcome all fear. This is also why Chöd was often used to overcome sickness in order to heal oneself and others. In some lineages of the Chöd practice, chodpas and chodmas (practitioners of Chöd) use a ritual bell, a specialized drum called a Chöd damaru, and a human thigh-bone trumpet  (often obtained from the charnel ground of sky burials).

Machig Labdron's Texts
The 10 texts on the profound Dharma of Chöd:
 Great Collection of Precepts on Chöd
 The Further Collection
 The Quintessential Collection
 The Appendices
 The Steps of the Crucial Points
 Refutation of Detractors
 The Secret Symbol Dharma
 The Three Cycles of Recitation
 Taking the Ground as the Path
 The Special Esoteric Instructions

"Demons" in Machig Labdron's Chöd
One of the distinct features of Machig Labdrön's Chöd is the focus on what are sometimes called either demons ('dre) or devils (bdud). It is clear from Machig Labdrön's writings and teachings that the entities being dealt with in Chöd practices are formulations of the human mind, rather than supernatural beings. One of Machig Labdrön's unique contributions to Chöd is her understanding of demons.

As Machig Labdrön explained in answer to the questions of one of her students, Gangpa Muksang, 

In another teaching, Machig Labdrön said:

According to Anila Rinchen at Kagyu Ling in Burgundy, France, the Tibetan term for "demon" could be translated as "neurosis".

Pilgrimage sites associated with Machig Labdron and Chöd

There are many pilgrimage sites in Tibet associated with Machig Labdrön. Among these are the Tselha Namsum meditation caves near Gyamda in Tibet.

See also
Emanation
Incarnation
Dampa Sangye
Lineage (Buddhism)
Women in Buddhism

References

Bibliography
Allione, Tsultrim. "The Biography of Machig Labdron (1055-1145)," in Women of Wisdom. Snow Lion Publications. 
Tsultrim Allione: Tibets Weise Frauen, Zeugnisse Weiblichen Erwachens, Theseus Verlag, 2001, 
Allione, Tsultrim (1998). "Feeding the Demons." in Buddhism in America. Brian D. Hotchkiss, ed. pp. 344–363. Rutland, VT; Boston, MA; Tokyo: Charles E. Tuttle Co., Inc.
Allione, Tsultrim (2008). "Feeding Your Demons: Ancient Wisdom for Resolving Inner Conflict." Little Brown and Company;. .
Benard, Elisabeth Anne (1990). "Ma Chig Lab Dron.” Chos Yang 3:43-51.
Beyer, Stephen (1973). The Cult of Tara. University of California Press. 
 

 
 
Kollmar-Paulenz, Karenina (1998). “Ma gcig Lab sgrn ma—The Life of a Tibetan Woman Mystic between Adaptation and Rebellion.” The Tibet Journal 23(2):11-32.

External links
TBRC
Yogini Macik Labdron and the Formation of Chod Sect - Section 2 of China Tibetology article: "Nuns of the unique Joyul (gcod-yul) Sect of Tibetan Buddhism"
Nuns of the unique Joyul (gcod-yul)Sect of Tibetan Buddhism
Summary of Machig's life from Jerome Edou's book 
The Mother Essence Lineage, Part 2 – Ma-gÇig Labdrön and Jomo Menmo
Chö/Chöd/Lineages associated with Machig Labdrön
Extract of Machig Labdron's biography by Tsultrim Allione
Machik Labdrön's Prayer to All Lineages

Dakinis
1055 births
1149 deaths
Bon
Dzogchen lamas
Tibetan Buddhist spiritual teachers
Tibetan Buddhists from Tibet
Tibetan Buddhist yogis
Women yogis
Vajrayana and women
Female Buddhist spiritual teachers
Tibetan women
11th-century Tibetan people
12th-century Tibetan people
11th-century Buddhists
12th-century Buddhists
Samding Dorje Phagmos
11th-century women